Copperhead Road is the third studio album by Steve Earle, released in 1988. The album is often referred to as Earle's first "rock record"; Earle himself calls it the world's first blend of heavy metal and bluegrass, and the January 26, 1989 review of the album by Rolling Stone suggested that the style be called "power twang".

Composition
The songs on side one of the album reflect Earle's politics: the title track attacks the War on Drugs, and the song "Snake Oil" compares then president Ronald Reagan to a traveling con man and draws attention to his "legacy of creative deceit". The title track and "Johnny Come Lately" (performed with The Pogues) both describe the experiences of returning veterans.  The latter compares the experience of US servicemen fighting in World War II with those in the Vietnam War, and contrasts the differing receptions they received on returning home. "Back to the Wall" is about poverty, describing the life of the homeless in the US.

Unlike some issues-oriented musicians, however, Earle does not limit himself to political material. The second side of the album consists of more personal, slower tempo works: love songs ("Even When I'm Blue" for example) and a holiday offering ("Nothing but a Child", performed with Maria McKee).

The title song "Copperhead Road" tells of a Vietnam War veteran, scion of a rural moonshine bootlegging clan, who returns home to Johnson County, Tennessee and decides instead to enter the marijuana business, which is shown by the line "I'll take the seed from Colombia and Mexico". Copperhead Road was an actual road near Mountain City, Tennessee although it has since been renamed as Copperhead Hollow Rd. due to theft of road signs bearing the song's name.  The song also inspired a popular line dance timed to the beat of the song and has been used as the theme music for the Discovery Channel reality series Moonshiners.

Reception

In declaring Copperhead Road Rock Album of the Week on October 21, 1988, The New York Times described it as "exactly half of a brilliant album, with five smart, ornery, memorable story-songs."  With references to Bruce Springsteen, John Mellencamp and the Rolling Stones the paper applauded Earle for introducing country music's storytelling and three-chord structures to rockabilly and contemporary rock music. Side two, however, the Times dismissed as "strictly average" love songs and a "hokey" Christmas song. Time, including it in the September 19, 1988, Critics' Choices, described it as a "rock-inflected, country-based album" that "takes long chances with big themes ... and does them proud".

Rolling Stone published their review of Copperhead Road on January 26, 1989. Rob Tannenbaum wrote that the album "begins murderously and ends sentimentally ... split into two song cycles" and described the first side as being "as powerful as any music made this year". Of side two he admits disappointment at conventional love songs, saying Earle "has already examined this terrain and done a better job of it." Nonetheless, the review compares Earle to Randy Newman, Bruce Springsteen, and Waylon Jennings among others, and concludes with Rolling Stones designation of Earle as an "important artist" and finding Copperhead Road worthy of four stars.

Airplay on rock radio stations drove the title track into Billboards Album Rock Top Ten chart, and that in turn helped Copperhead Road on Billboard's Album Chart, where it peaked at number 56.

Waylon Jennings covered "The Devil's Right Hand" on 1986's Will the Wolf Survive. "I was a big Waylon Jennings fan", noted Bob Seger, who covered the song on 2014's Ride Out. "I heard 'The Devil's Right Hand' in a movie called Betrayed in 1988. Every time I'd see it on cable, maybe once every five years, I'd say, 'Goddamn, that's a cool song. I want to do that some day.' And then, in maybe 2000, I found the movie in a movie bin, watched it and was like, 'Oh my god, Steve Earle wrote it! No wonder I like it.

In 2000 it was voted number 412 in Colin Larkin's All Time Top 1000 Albums.

Track listing
All tracks written by Steve Earle except where noted.

Original release (1988)
 "Copperhead Road" – 4:29
 "Snake Oil" – 3:31
 "Back to the Wall" – 5:29
 "The Devil's Right Hand" (arranged by Garry W. Tallent) – 3:04
 "Johnny Come Lately" – 4:11
 "Even When I'm Blue" – 4:14
 "You Belong to Me" – 4:25
 "Waiting on You" (Steve Earle, Richard Bennett) – 5:10
 "Once You Love" (Steve Earle, Larry Crane) – 4:39
 "Nothing but a Child" – 4:26

Deluxe edition (2008)
On April 29, 2008, Geffen Records/Universal Music released a 2-disc deluxe edition of Copperhead Road. Disc one is the album as listed above, digitally remastered. Disc two features previously unreleased live recordings.

Disc two
 "The Devil's Right Hand" (live in Raleigh, North Carolina – November 19, 1987) – 4:02
 "Fearless Heart" (live in Raleigh) – 4:32
 "San Antonio Girl" (live in Raleigh) – 4:23
 "Nobody but You" / "Continental Trailways Bus" (live in Raleigh) – 6:26
 "My Baby Worships Me" (live in Raleigh) – 3:33
 "Wheels" (Chris Hillman, Gram Parsons) (live in Raleigh) – 4:45
 "The Week of Living Dangerously" (live in Raleigh) – 7:26
 "Johnny Come Lately" (solo, live in Raleigh) – 3:55
 "Brown and Root" (Emmylou Harris, Rodney Crowell) (live in Raleigh) – 3:46
 "I Love You Too Much" (live in Raleigh) – 4:28
 "It's All Up to You" (Steve Earle, Harry Stinson) (live in Raleigh) – 6:11
 "Nebraska" (Bruce Springsteen) (solo, live – 1988) – 5:21
 "Copperhead Road" (live in Calgary, Canada – April 1989) – 4:08
 "I Ain't Ever Satisfied" (live in Calgary) – 3:52
 "Dead Flowers" (Mick Jagger, Keith Richards) (live in Calgary) – 5:36
 "Little Sister" (Greg Trooper) (solo, live in Calgary) – 3:15
 "Guitar Town" (live in Calgary) – 2:36

Personnel

 Steve Earle – vocals, guitars, harmonica, 6-string bass, mandolin
 Donny Roberts – guitars, 6-string bass
 Bill Lloyd – acoustic guitar, 12-string electric guitar
 Bucky Baxter – pedal steel, lap steel, Dobro
 Ken Moore – synthesizer and organ
 John Barlow Jarvis – piano
 Kelley Looney – bass
 Kurt Custer – drums
 Neil MacColl – mandolin on "Johnny Come Lately"
 John Cowan, Maria McKee, Radney Foster – background vocals
 Chris Birkett – drum programming on "You Belong to Me"
 Gary Tallent – arrangement on "The Devil's Right Hand"
 The Pogues played on "Johnny Come Lately"
 Telluride played on "Nothing But a Child"

The Pogues
 Terry Woods – cittern
 Phil Chevron – guitar, vocals
 Jem Finer – banjo
 James Fearnley – accordion
 Spider Stacy – tin whistle, vocals
 Shane MacGowan – banjo, bodhran
 Darryl Hunt – bass
 Andrew Ranken – drums
Telluride
 Sam Bush – mandolin
 Jerry Douglas – dobro
 Mark O'Connor – violin
 Edgar Meyer – bass violin

Technical
Joe Hardy – recording, mixing
Chris Birkett – recording on "Johnny Come Lately"
Simon Levy - art direction
Jeff Morris - design
June Beard - patch design

Chart performance

Although no singles from the album were released in the U.S., three of the album's tracks were released as singles in the UK.

References

External links
 Rock 'n' roll rebel or country crusader? December 3, 1987, Hamilton Spectator – (Earle explains theme of Copperhead Road).

Steve Earle albums
1988 albums
Songs of the Vietnam War
Albums produced by Tony Brown (record producer)
Uni Records albums